Edward Burgess (known in Persian as Berjīs Ṣāḥeb; 1810–18 June 1855) was an English merchant and British subject in Qajar Iran, who became a court functionary under the Qajar rulers.

Edward and his brother Charles first established themselves in the northwestern Iranian city of Tabriz in the early 1830s, specializing in the import of Manchester cotton goods. At some point Edward was hired by prince Bahman Mirza as printer, translator and tutor. Bahman Mirza was interested in geography, European history and modern natural history, with Edward being the best he could find to satisfy this curiosity. In 1846 Edward presented the Joghrafiya-yi Alam ("Geography of the World"), originally commissioned by Bahman Mirza, to the ruling king (shah) Mohammad Shah (1834–1846). The work also contained some historical accounts of modern Europe. Although the text of this translation was a hundred years old, Edward found himself able to update its content aided by several contemporary European gazetteers. Following Bahman Mirza's defection to Tsarist Russia, Edward entered the service of prince Naser al-Din Mirza (later ruling as Naser al-Din Shah, 1848–1896).

Upon Naser al-Din's accession to the throne, Edward was promoted to become his principal translator, perhaps at the recommendation of Mirza Taqi Khan (later known as Amir Kabir), then vazir-e nezam of the Azerbaijan province. He appointed him to oversee (mobasherat) the contents of the Ruzname-ye waqaye-e ettefaqiya, a famous Persian newspaper established in 1851 by Amir Kabir, chief minister during the first four years of Naser al-Din Shah's reign. Following the murder of Amir Kabir in 1852, Burgess complained that the procedure for publication of the newspaper had deteriorated significantly, to the extent that he "publish[ed] nothing except the foreign news, without the prime minister’s having previously revised it" and that he was "obliged to consult the prime minister and also sometimes the king himself about articles to be put in the gazette".

He married an Armenian lady from Tabriz, with whom he had a son named John who also died in 1855, being 18 months old. Edward was buried at the Armenian cemetery which later became part of the city's Shoghakat Church.

References

Sources
 
 
 
 

1810s births
1855 deaths
19th-century English people
British expatriates in Iran
People of Qajar Iran
Burials in Tabriz
Printers
English translators
Translators from English